Volustana (Βολούστανα) or  Volustana pass was the main gate between ancient Macedonia and Thessaly. It is not far from Petra (Pieria).

See also
Stena Sarantaporou

References
In the shadow of Olympus By Eugene N. Borza Page 77 
Travels in northern Greece By William Martin Leake page 337 

Geography of ancient Pieria
Geography of ancient Thessaly
Mountain passes of Greece
Landforms of Pieria (regional unit)
Landforms of Central Macedonia